Hydrangea coenobialis is a species of flowering plant in the family Hydrangeaceae, native to southeast China.

References

coenobialis
Endemic flora of China
Flora of Southeast China